The Iron & Oil Association was a six–team Minor League Baseball league that operated in 1884. The league franchises were based in Ohio and Pennsylvania. The league folded following the  season.

Cities represented 
 East Liberty, OH: East Liberty Stars 1884 
 Franklin, PA: Franklin Braves 1884 
 Johnstown, PA: Johnstown 1884 
 New Brighton, PA: New Brighton 1884 
 New Castle, PA: New Castle Nashannocks 1884 
 Oil City, PA: Oil City Oilers 1884 
 Youngstown, OH: Youngstown 1884

1884 Iron & Oil Association

New Brighton disbanded August 1 and was replaced by Johnstown.Oil City disbanded August 4.

References

Sources
Baseball Reference

Defunct minor baseball leagues in the United States
Baseball leagues in Pennsylvania
Baseball leagues in Ohio
Sports leagues established in 1884
Sports leagues disestablished in 1884